Shahr-e-Rey Metro Station is a station in Tehran Metro Line 1. It is located in Shahr-e-Rey. It is between Bagher Shahr Metro Station and Javanmard-e-Ghassab Metro Station.

References 

Tehran Metro stations